Miloš Čiernik (born 19 January 1963) is a Slovak weightlifter. He competed at the 1988 Summer Olympics and the 1992 Summer Olympics.

References

External links
 

1963 births
Living people
Slovak male weightlifters
Olympic weightlifters of Czechoslovakia
Weightlifters at the 1988 Summer Olympics
Weightlifters at the 1992 Summer Olympics
People from Námestovo
Sportspeople from the Žilina Region
World Weightlifting Championships medalists